Tomás Líam Romero Keubler (born 19 December 2000) is a professional footballer who plays as a goalkeeper for Major League Soccer club Toronto FC. Born in the United States, he represents the El Salvador national team.

Early life
He played youth soccer with Real Jersey FC, before later joining the Philadelphia Union's YSC Academy when he was in eighth grade.

College career
In December 2017, he committed to Georgetown University to play for the men's soccer team starting in 2019. He made his debut and earned his first victory and clean sheet on September 2 against the Temple Owls. In November 2019, he was named the Big East Conference Goalkeeper of the Week. In December 2019, he helped the Hoyas win the National title, making the game-winning penalty shootout save, to lead Georgetown to their first-ever National Title in soccer. He was unable to play in 2020, as the season was cancelled due to the COVID-19 pandemic.

Club career
On September 10, 2016, Romero was called up to the Union's USL affiliate Bethlehem Steel FC to serve as the backup keeper for a match against the Charleston Battery. In the offseason, he attended training camp with both Bethlehem and the Philadelphia Union. On April 1, 2017, he made his professional debut at age 16 for the Steel, against the Rochester Rhinos, becoming the youngest goalkeeper to start a USL match. In July 2019, he was named USL Championship Player of the Week. During the fall of 2020, he trained with Philadelphia Union II (the renamed Bethlehem Steel), after the Georgetown season was cancelled due to the COVID-19 pandemic.

In January 2021, he joined Major League Soccer club Los Angeles FC, after the club acquired his homegrown player rights from the Union for $50,000 in general allocation money. He officially signed his first professional contract with LAFC on 1 February 2021. He began the 2021 season on loan with the club's USL Championship affiliate team, the Las Vegas Lights. On June 23, 2021, Romero made his MLS debut with LAFC in a 2–0 win over FC Dallas, keeping a clean sheet. He returned to Las Vegas on loan in 2022. He was part of LAFC's 2022 MLS Cup winning squad, although he did not feature in any matches that season. After the 2022 season, LAFC declined his club option for the 2023 season.

In November 2022, at the 2022 MLS Re-Entry Draft, Toronto FC claimed his contract for the 2023 season, re-uniting him with Bob Bradley, who was his former head coach at LAFC in 2021.

International career 
Romero was eligible to represent the United States, where he was born, and El Salvador through descent.

In August 2016, he was called up to the El Salvador national U17 team for the first time. He made his debut with the U17s at the Central American Qualifying tournament for the 2017 CONCACAF U17 Championship on 21 November 2016 against Belize U17. He subsequently represented the side at the 2017 CONCACAF U-17 Championship in Panama. He also played with the side at the 2017 Bolivarian Games.

In June 2019, he was called up to the El Salvador U23 for the Olympic qualifiers. He made his debut for the U23s against Haiti U23 on March 26, 2021.

On May 31, 2021, the Salvadoran Football Federation released a statement that Romero had declined an invitation to the El Salvador senior team because he wanted to maintain the possibility of playing for the United States. However, he subequenltly committed to El Salvador and debuted for the senior team in a friendly 1–1 draw against Ecuador on 5 December 2021.

Career statistics

Club

International

References

External links
 

2000 births
Living people
People from Cherry Hill, New Jersey
Sportspeople from Camden County, New Jersey
Soccer players from New Jersey
Salvadoran footballers
El Salvador international footballers
El Salvador youth international footballers
American soccer players
American sportspeople of Salvadoran descent
Citizens of El Salvador through descent
Georgetown Hoyas men's soccer players
Philadelphia Union II players
Los Angeles FC players
Association football goalkeepers
USL Championship players
Homegrown Players (MLS)
Las Vegas Lights FC players
Major League Soccer players